One Mindanao (formerly known as Testigo, 24 Oras Southern Mindanao and 24 Oras Davao) is a Philippine television news broadcasting show broadcast by GMA Davao, GMA Cagayan de Oro,  GMA General Santos and GMA Zamboanga. Originally anchored by Tek Ocampo, it premiered on October 4, 1999. Sarah Hilomen-Velasco from GMA Davao and Cyril Chaves from GMA Cagayan de Oro currently serve as anchors together with Efren Mamac from GMA Zamboanga and Jestoni Jumamil from GMA General Santos.

Overview
The newscast covers the most significant news and features in six regions in Mindanao; Davao Region, Northern Mindanao, Caraga, Soccsksargen, Bangsamoro Autonomous Region in Muslim Mindanao and Zamboanga Peninsula (including Zamboanga City, where interviewees speak Chavacano, a Spanish-based creole language), through the network's news teams from Southern Mindanao and news stringers across the island group.

The newscast airs from Monday to Friday from 5:10 PM to 5:40 PM  on GMA Davao (Channel 5), GMA Cagayan De Oro (Channel 35), GMA General Santos (Channel 8) and GMA Zamboanga (Channel 9) with a simulcast over TV-4 Dipolog, TV-3 Pagadian, TV-11 Iligan, TV-12 Bukidnon, TV-5 Ozamiz, TV-26 Butuan, TV-10 Surigao, TV-2 Tandag, TV-12 Kidapawan, TV-12 Cotabato and TV-12 Jolo.

One Mindanao is also re-aired for national viewers under GTV’s late-night block "Regional TV Strip" on a weekly basis. It airs every Thursday at 11:50 PM from May 21, 2020, to July 22, 2021..

The program also airs worldwide on GMA News TV.

History

As Testigo (1999-2014)
Its main newscaster is Tek Ocampo, he started with Testigo (first named as Testigo: GMA Super Balita) on October 4, 1999 and made a name as a national reporter for GMA News when he left the show in 2002.  After his stint with GMA Manila, he came back to Davao to anchor the program once more.

To strengthen the regional network's commitment of bringing the latest, most credible and most comprehensive news from the region, in February 2013, the newscast started its international broadcast on GMA News TV International alongside other regional newscasts Balitang Amianan (now One North Central Luzon) and Balitang Bisdak.

Testigo ended its 15-year run on November 7, 2014.

As 24 Oras Southern Mindanao (2014-2016)
On November 10, 2014, the newscast adopts the branding of its now-main newscast 24 Oras as 24 Oras Southern Mindanao, following their change of graphics and theme music of the network's flagship newscast of the same name.

Since February 1, 2016, this program is the only GMA regional newscast to use the 24 Oras branding after two of its other regional newscasts reverted branding to its original names, Balitang Amianan (since 2008) and Balitang Bisdak (since 1999).

As 24 Oras Davao (2016-2017)
On October 3, 2016, 24 Oras Southern Mindanao changed once again its branding simply as 24 Oras Davao. The rebranding coincided to the 17th anniversary of the regional network's news department alongside GMA Cebu's Balitang Bisdak, as well as expanding out the coverage of GMA Dagupan's Balitang Amianan.

On January 2, 2017, the newscast updated its opening billboard, soundtrack and lower third graphics similar to 24 Oras, together with other sister newscasts Balitang Amianan and Balitang Bisdak.

On April 17, 2017, senior correspondent Real Sorroche was promoted as anchor of the newscast, with the launch of his own segment Usapang Real.

As One Mindanao (2017-present)
With the end of 24 Oras Davao, GMA Regional TV launched a news program scoping the entire Mindanao island called One Mindanao. The newscast is also considered as the successor for other news programs produced by GMA for Mindanao, namely 24 Oras Northern Mindanao (formerly Testigo Northern Mindanao, from 2013 to 2015) of GMA Northern Mindanao and Soccksargen Isyu Karon (from 2010 to 2011) and Flash Bulletin (from 2010 to 2015) of GMA General Santos. At the same time, GMA Cagayan de Oro reopened its studios with former relief anchor and correspondent Clyde Macascas (later replaced by Cyril Chaves, Ethel Ipanag and James Paolo Yap), which is used by the newscast. Prior to the launching of its studio, reports, and headlines from Cagayan de Oro and the rest of Northern Mindanao and Caraga are aired live from the GMA Cagayan de Oro Control Room. From Soccsksargen, BARMM and Zamboanga Peninsula (including Zamboanga City), reports and headlines are also brought by the newscast, the only used Cebuano and Filipino for the Mindanaoan-newscast from August 28, 2017 to November 22, 2019, now currently as switched full Cebuano language to the Mindanaoan-Newscast on November 25, 2019.

On July 29, 2019, the newscast unveiled a minor revision of its titlecard, changing its font color to green, reflecting it with its co-produced GMA Regional TV Weekend News (later Regional TV Weekend News, now Regional TV News), which was launched on July 27. One Mindanao was relaunched on August 19, 2019, adopting graphics and studio sets for Davao and Cagayan de Oro stations from the national newscast. In addition, the program opens its doors for viewers to become its live studio audience every Friday, similar to its sister regional newscast Balitang Bisdak.

Real Sorroche was last seen anchoring the newscast on June 25, 2021 and later eventually left the newscast on September 4, 2021 the same year due to unknown reasons. Tek Ocampo left the newscast on September 17, 2021 to run for politics. Co-anchors and correspondents Jandi Esteban, Cyril Chaves and Rgil Relator joined Hilomen-Velasco in the anchor team on September 20, 2021, all taking turns in anchoring the newscast, using the two-anchor format that the other regional newscasts adopted.

The program started using the studios from the GMA General Santos on March 17, 2022 and the GMA Zamboanga Station on March 24, 2022, which have been recently opened since then, now in tandem with the GMA Cagayan de Oro Station and GMA Davao Station. Co-anchors and news producers Efren Mamac from GMA Zamboanga and Jestoni Jumamil from GMA General Santos were added to the newscast's roster of sub-anchors.

Anchors
 Sarah Hilomen-Velasco 
 Cyril Chaves 
 Efren Mamac 
 Jestoni Jumamil

Correspondents
 PJ dela Peña 
 Jandi Esteban  - Sub Anchor for Hilomen-Velasco.
 Rgil Relator 
 Kent Abrigana 
 Abbey Caballero 
 James Paolo Yap 
 Krissa Marie Dapitan

Former anchors and reporters
 Temujin "Tek" Ocampo (now as Davao City Councilor and Chairperson)
 Cherry Maning
 Real Sorroche (now with 97.9 XFM Davao)
 Jun Digamon (now with 91.5 Brigada News FM Davao)
 Vladimir Fernando
 Solomon Gonzales
 Brecil Kempis
 LJ Lindaan
 Derf Maiz
 Fem Nacario (now with DXMD RMN 927 General Santos)
 Richy Nalagon
 Julius Pacot (now with PTV-11 Davao)
 Jett Pogoy
 Sheryll Lou Pontillas
 Mariz Posadas (now with 91.5 Brigada News FM Davao)
 Antoinette Principe
 Jennifer Solis (now with Brigada News TV General Santos)
 Jan Bautista (now with 97.9 XFM Davao)
 Dotty Ibanez
 Madonna Timbal-Senajon (now with 97.9 XFM Davao)
 Leo Villareal
 Marlon Palma Gil
 Helen Quiñanola (now with ABS-CBN TFC News Australia) 
 Jesrel Himang (now with 105.5 Brigada News FM Trento)
 John Paul Seniel (former senior desk officer)
 Clyde Macascas
 Ferdinandh Cabrera
 Richard Grande (now with 103.1 Radyo Bandera News FM General Santos)
 Ethel Ipanag (now with 102.5 Brigada News FM Cagayan de Oro)
 Chynn Sabute
 Sheillah Vergara-Rubio (now with 97.9 XFM Davao, along veteran anchors with her colleague Real Sorroche)

Segments
 Agri News
 Alerto Mindanao
 At Home with GMA Regional TV
 Balitang Barangay
 Bangon Mindanao
 Bida Ka Mindanao
 Breaking News
 Campus Update
 D Best ka Mom 
 E-News
 Extra Income
 Fiesta Mindanao
 Hanepbuhay
 Hayop sa Balita
 Health Watch
 Hulicam
 Kapuso Fiesta
 Kapuso Serbisyo
 Kwento ng Pilipino
 Kumbira
 May Trabaho Ka
 Mindanao Karun
 My Mindanao
 Panahon Karon
 Price Watch
 Ratsada Mindanao
 RTV Presents
 Serbisyong Totoo
 #SpreadKindness
 Suroy Ta
 Tatak Mindanao
 Time Out
 Usapang Real
 Viral Now
 'Yan ang Pinoy!

References

External links
 

1999 Philippine television series debuts
Flagship evening news shows
GMA Network news shows
GMA Integrated News and Public Affairs shows
Television in Davao City
Philippine television news shows